Acrolepiopsis postomacula is a moth of the family Acrolepiidae. It was described by Shōnen Matsumura in 1931. It is found in Japan

The larvae feed on Hosta lancifolia.

References

Moths described in 1931
Acrolepiidae
Moths of Japan